Tarka Pass, is situated in the Eastern Cape, province of South Africa, on the road between Cradock, Eastern Cape and Somerset East.

Mountain passes of the Eastern Cape